Cicindelini is a tribe of tiger beetles in the family Cicindelidae, containing the overwhelming majority of genera (>110) and species in the family.

Genera

 Abroscelis Hope, 1838 
 Antennaria Dokhtouroff, 1883 
 Apterodela Rivalier, 1950
 Apteroessa Hope, 1838 
 Archidela Rivalier, 1963 
 Baloghiella Mandl, 1981 
 Bennigsenium W. Horn, 1897 
 Brasiella Rivalier, 1954 
 Caledonica Chaudoir, 1860 
 Caledonomorpha W. Horn, 1897 
 Callytron Gistl, 1848 
 Calomera Motschulsky, 1862
 Calyptoglossa Jeannel, 1946 
 Cenothyla Rivalier, 1969 
 Cephalota Dokhtouroff, 1883
 Chaetodera Jeannel, 1946 
 Cheilonycha Lacordaire, 1843 
 Cicindela Linnaeus, 1758
 Cicindelidia Rivalier, 1954
 Cratohaerea Chaudoir, 1850 
 Cylindera Westwood, 1831
 Darlingtonica Cassola, 1986 
 Diastrophella Rivalier, 1957 
 Dilatotarsa Dokhtouroff, 1882 
 Distipsidera Westwood, 1837
 Dromica Dejean, 1826
 Dromicoida Werner, 1995 
 Dromochorus Guerin-Meneville, 1845 
 Ellipsoptera Dokhtouroff, 1883
 Enantiola Rivalier, 1961
 Eunota Rivalier, 1954 
 Euprosopus Dejean, 1825 
 Euryarthron Guerin-Meneville, 1849
 Eurymorpha Hope, 1838
 Euzona Rivalier, 1963 
 Grandopronotalia W. Horn, 1936 
 Guineica Rivalier, 1963 
 Habrodera Motschulsky, 1862
 Habroscelimorpha Dokhtouroff, 1883 
 Heptodonta Hope, 1838 
 Hypaetha Leconte, 1860 
 Iresia Dejean, 1831
 Jansenia Chaudoir, 1865 
 Langea W. Horn, 1901 
 Leptognatha Rivalier, 1963
 Lophyra Motschulsky, 1859
 Macfarlandia Sumlin, 1981 
 Manautea Deuve, 2006 
 Megalomma Westwood, 1842 
 Micromentignatha Sumlin, 1981 
 Microthylax Rivalier, 1954 
 Myriochila Motschulsky, 1862
 Naviauxella Cassola, 1988 
 Neochila Basilewsky, 1953 
 Neocicindela Rivalier, 1963 
 Neolaphyra Bedel, 1895 
 Nickerlea W. Horn, 1899 
 Notospira Rivalier, 1961 
 Odontocheila Laporte, 1834
 Opilidia Rivalier, 1954 
 Opisthencentrus W. Horn, 1893 
 Orthocindela Rivalier, 1972 
 Oxygonia Mannerheim, 1837
 Oxygoniola W. Horn, 1892
 Paraphysodeutera J. Moravec, 2002 
 Pentacomia Bates, 1872
 Peridexia Chaudoir, 1860
 Phyllodroma Lacordaire, 1843 
 Physodeutera Lacordaire, 1843 
 Polyrhanis Rivalier, 1963
 Pometon Fleutiaux, 1899 
 Prepusa Chaudoir, 1850 
 Probstia Cassola, 2002
 Pronyssa Bates, 1874 
 Pronyssiformia W. Horn, 1929 
 Prothyma Hope, 1838
 Prothymidia Rivalier, 1957
 Rhysopleura Sloane, 1906 
 Rhytidophaena Bates, 1891 
 Rivacindela Nidek, 1973 
 Ronhuberia J. Moravec & Kudrna, 2002 
 Salpingophora Rivalier, 1950 
 Socotrana Cassola & Wranik, 1998 
 Stenocosmia Rivalier, 1965 
 Sumlinia Cassola & Werner, 2001 
 Therates Latreille, 1816
 Thopeutica Schaum, 1861
 Vata Fauvel, 1903 
 Waltherhornia Olsoufieff, 1934

References

Further reading

 

 Richard E. White. (1983). Peterson Field Guides: Beetles. Houghton Mifflin Company.

Cicindelidae